Devereux Emmet (December 11, 1861 – December 30, 1934) was a pioneering American golf course architect who, according to one source, designed more than 150 courses worldwide.

Early life
Devereux Emmet was born in Pelham, New York,  on December 11, 1861, one of eight children of William Jenkins Emmet and Julia Colt Pierson.  He was the great-grandson of Thomas Addis Emmet.

College and marriage
Emmet graduated from Columbia University in 1883; in 1889 he married Ella B. Smith in an elaborate wedding at her home in New York City. Miss Smith, born in 1858, was the daughter of Judge J. Lawrence Smith and a niece of Alexander Turney Stewart.  Ella's sister Elizabeth "Bessie" Springs Smith was the wife of architect Stanford White. The couple had two children, Richard Smith Emmet (born October 1889) and Devereux Emmet, Jr. (born January 1897).

Golf course design career
On a vacation in England he spent time with his friend, Charles B. Macdonald, who was measuring British golf courses in preparation for the design of the National Golf Links of America. Emmet's first design was Island Golf Links, a predecessor of Garden City Golf Club.  A friend of his remarked: 

In 1924 he hired Alfred H. Tull as a design associate, and in 1929 made him a partner in the firm of Emmet, Emmet and Tull.  The Tull-Emmet partnership continued until Emmet's death in 1934.

Amateur golf
Emmet was a talented amateur golfer. He made the quarter-finals of the 1904 British Amateur and won the Bahamas Amateur at the age of 66. In 1916, after he won the father-son tournament at Sleepy Hollow Country Club with Devereux Emmet, Jr., the United States Golf Association instituted the so-called architects rule that barred golf course architects from competing as amateurs in tournaments.

Death and legacy
Devereux Emmet died in Garden City, New York, on December 30, 1934.

Courses designed

Emmet designed many of his courses in an era of wooden-shafted clubs. Because the holes are often short by current standards many of his designs have since been reworked.
 
Note: Dates indicate when the course opened.
Note: This is a partial list, portions of which were taken from WorldGolf.

 Belmont Hills Country Club, St Clairsville, Ohio, 1924
 Bethpage State Park (Green), Farmingdale, New York, 1923
 Congressional Country Club (Blue), Bethesda, Maryland, 1924
 Congressional Country Club (Gold), Bethesda, Maryland, 1924 
(remodeled by George Fazio and Tom Fazio in 1977 and by Arthur Hills in 2000)
 Hartford Golf Club (Blue, Green), West Hartford, Connecticut, 1914
 Bonnie-Briar Country Club, Larchmont, New York, 1921
 Bedford Golf and Tennis Club Bedford, New York, 1891
 Brentwood Country Club, Brentwood, New York, 1925
 Capital Hills at Albany, Albany, New York, 1928
 Cherry Valley Club, Garden City, New York, 1916
 Coonamessett Country Club Falmouth, Massachusetts (now Cape Cod Country Club)
 There is no evidence Emmet was ever at Copake Lake Country Club,  Craryville, New York, 1921
 Dudley Hill Golf Club (9 holes), Dudley, Massachusetts, 1926
 Edison Club, Rexford, New York, 1925
 Engineers Country Club, Roslyn Harbor, New York, 1921 
(originally designed by Herbert Strong, remodeled by Devereux Emmet in 1921)
 Country Club of Farmington, Farmington, Connecticut, 1924 
 Garden City Golf Club, Garden City, New York, 1899 (later remodeled by Walter Travis)
 Leatherstocking Golf Course, Cooperstown, New York, 1909
 Mohawk Golf Club (East), Schenectady, New York, 1907
 Glen Head Country Club, Glen Head, New York, 1920s
 Hartford Golf Club (Green, Red), West Hartford, Connecticut, 1914
 Greenacres Country Club, Lawrenceville, New Jersey, 1932
 Green Meadow Club, Rye, New York, 1917 - known today as Willow Ridge Country Club. The Green Meadow Golf Club was an offshoot of The Apawamis Club and formed in 1917 directly adjacent to Apawamis but with frontage on North Street. In fact, in 1927 the two clubs considered consolidating. 
 Hampshire Country Club, Mamaroneck, New York, 1927
 Huntington Country Club, Huntington, New York, 1910
 Huntington Crescent Club, Huntington, New York, 1914 
(renovated by Devereux Emmet and Alfred H. Tull in 1931) 
 Keney Park Golf Club, Hartford, Connecticut, 1927
 Lake Isle Country Club, Eastchester, 1926
 Leewood Country Club (Eastchester (town), New York) 1922
 Long Hill Country Club, East Hartford, Connecticut, 1930 
 Mahopac Golf Club, Mahopac, New York, 1893
 Manchester Country Club, Manchester, Connecticut, 1917 
(with Tom Bendelow)
 McGregor Links Country Club, Saratoga Springs, New York
 Mechanicville Golf Club, Mechanicville, New York, 1909
 Nassau Country Club, Glen Cove, New York, 1896
 Oliver D. Appleton Golf Course at St. Lawrence University, Canton, NY 1926 (Original 9 holes)
 Pelham Country Club, Pelham Manor, New York, 1908
 Pomonok Country Club, Queens, New York, 1921 – closed in 1949
 Powelton Club, Newburgh, New York, 1892
 Radisson Cable Beach & Golf Resort, Commonwealth of the Bahamas, 1929
 Eisenhower Park Golf Course (Red), East Meadow, New York, 1914
 Hartford Golf Club (Red, Blue), West Hartford, Connecticut, 1896 
(with Donald Ross)
 Riddell's Bay Golf and Country Club, The Islands of Bermuda, 1922
 Ridgewood Country Club, Danbury, Connecticut, 1927
 Rockaway River Country Club, Denville, New Jersey, 1923
 Rockville Links Club, Rockville Centre, New York, 1924
 Rye Golf Club, Rye, New York, 1921 
 Salisbury Golf Club, East Meadow, New York 
 Schuyler Meadows Club, Loudonville, New York, 1928
 Seawane Country Club, Hewlett Harbor, New York, 1927
 St. George's Golf & Country Club, East Setauket, New York, 1917
 St. Mary's Country Club, Saint Mary's, Pennsylvania, 1924 
 Wee Burn Country Club, Darien, Connecticut, 1902
 Mohawk Golf Club (West), Schenectady, New York, 1903
 Wheatley Hills Golf Club, East Williston, New York, 1913
(remodeled by Devereux Emmet and Alfred Tull in 1931)
 Wheeling Country Club, Wheeling, West Virginia, 1902
 Wheeling Park Golf Course, Wheeling, West Virginia, 1926

References

1861 births
1934 deaths
Emmet family
Golf course architects
Columbia University alumni
People from Pelham, New York